Radical 32 or radical earth meaning "earth" is one of the 31 Kangxi radicals (214 radicals total) composed of three strokes.

In the Kangxi Dictionary, there are 580 characters (out of 49,030) to be found under this radical.

 is also the 29th indexing component in the Table of Indexing Chinese Character Components predominantly adopted by Simplified Chinese dictionaries published in mainland China. Kangxi radical 33 ( "scholar") is merged to this radical as an associated indexing component of the principal indexing component  in mainland China.

In the Chinese wuxing ("Five Phases"), 土 represents the element earth.

Evolution

Derived characters

Literature

External links

Unihan Database - U+571F

032
029